NA-64 Gujrat-III is a constituency for the National Assembly of Pakistan. It includes Lalamusa, Akhtar Karnana and Dinga city.

Members of Parliament

2018-2022: NA-70 Gujrat-III

Election 2002 

General elections were held on 10 Oct 2002. Qamar Zaman Kaira of PPP won by 83,438 votes.

Election 2008 

General elections were held on 18 Feb 2008. Qamar Zaman Kaira of PPP won by 89,555 votes.

Election 2013 

General elections were held on 11 May 2013. Jaffar Iqbal of PML-N won by 83,024 votes and became the  member of National Assembly.

Election 2018 
General elections were held on 25 July 2018.

By-election 2023 
A by-election will be held on 19 March 2023 due to the resignation of Syed Faizul Hassan Shah, the previous MNA from this seat.

See also
NA-63 Gujrat-II
NA-65 Gujrat-IV

References

External links 
Election result's official website
Delimitation 2018 official website Election Commission of Pakistan

70
70